Quin, also known as Quin & Clooney is a parish in County Clare and part of the Abbey grouping of parishes within the Roman Catholic Diocese of Killaloe.

Current (2022) co-parish priest is Tom O'Gorman.

The present parish contains the mediaeval parishes of Quin and Clooney, that were administered together since the seventeenth century.

Churches
The main church is the St. Mary's Church in Quin. Building of this church started in 1836, to be completed in 1837. The interior was finished in 1856.

The second church in the parish is the Church of Pope John XXIII in the village Clooney. This church was built in 1975 and replaced an older chapel on that site. First there was an eighteenth century mass house here, that was replaced by a small chapel in 1801. An attempt in 1820 to replace that chapel was thwarted by the local landlord. Instead, the building was enlarged in 1839.

The third church of the parish is a chapel named St. Stephen Church in the townland Maghera. It was built in 1932.

External links
 St Stephen’s Church, Maghera

References

Parishes of the Roman Catholic Diocese of Killaloe